United Nations Security Council resolution 752, adopted unanimously on 15 May 1992, after reaffirming resolutions 713 (1991), 721 (1991), 724 (1991), 727 (1992), 740 (1992) 743 (1992) and 749 (1992), the Council expressed concern at the situation in the Yugoslavia, in particular the fighting in Bosnia and Herzegovina, demanding that all parties end the fighting and respect the ceasefire signed on 12 April 1992.

The Council called on all parties to co-operate with the efforts of the European Community to find a negotiated political settlement, noting that the change of borders by force is unacceptable. It also demanded that units of the Yugoslav People's Army and elements of the Croatian Army withdraw or be placed under the authority of the Government of Bosnia and Herzegovina. The Resolution demanded respect of sovereignty and territorial integrity of Bosnia and Herzegovina. The irregular forces present in the territory should have been disbanded and disarmed.

The resolution then emphasised the importance of humanitarian aid to the region taking into account the large number of displaced people, and called on the parties present in Bosnia and Herzegovina to allow for humanitarian access. It also asked for full co-operation with the United Nations Protection Force and European Community Monitoring Mission. Finally, Resolution 752 asked the Secretary-General Boutros Boutros-Ghali keep the situation under review.

The failure to implement the current resolution served as a basis for further international sanctions against Federal Republic of Yugoslavia, beginning with Resolution 757.

See also
 Bosnian War
 Croatian War of Independence
 List of United Nations Security Council Resolutions 701 to 800 (1991–1993)
 Yugoslav Wars

References

External links
 
Text of the Resolution at undocs.org

 0752
 0752
1992 in Yugoslavia
1992 in Croatia
1992 in Bosnia and Herzegovina
1992 in Slovenia
 0752
May 1992 events